Anaïs Oluwatoyin Estelle Marinho (born 9 August 2000), known professionally as Arlo Parks, is a British singer and songwriter. Her debut studio album, Collapsed in Sunbeams, was released in 2021 to critical acclaim and peaked at number three on the UK Albums Chart. It earned her nominations for Album of the Year, Best New Artist and Best British Female Solo Artist at the 2021 Brit Awards. It won the 2021 Hyundai Mercury Prize for Best Album.

Early life 
Anaïs Oluwatoyin Estelle Marinho was born on 9 August 2000, and raised in Hammersmith, West London. She is of half Nigerian, quarter Chadian and quarter French ancestry. Her mother was born in Paris. Marinho learned to speak French before she learned English.

Career

2018–2019: Super Sad Generation and Sophie 
Parks chose her stage name as a distinctive personal pseudonym, inspired by King Krule and Frank Ocean. In 2018, she began uploading demos to BBC Music Introducing. This caught the attention of radio presenters across the UK who distributed these demos to Ali Raymond of Beatnik Creative, who soon began managing Parks. She made her solo debut when she released the song "Cola" through Beatnik Records in November 2018, and announced the release of her debut EP, Super Sad Generation. She told Line of Best Fit that the song is "a reminder that betrayal is inevitable when it comes to pretty people that think flowers fix everything." Olivia Swash wrote that the vocals on the song "flourish thanks to [Parks'] creative writing background, with her delicate tone taking centre stage against the gently plodding guitars and soft crackle of vinyl." By November 2019, the song had amassed over three million streams on Spotify.

Following the release of "Cola", Parks signed to Transgressive Records. She released the title track of her upcoming EP, Super Sad Generation, in January 2019. Robin Murray told Clash that the song portrays an "astute, nuanced creative control that also utilises word-play that speaks of youthful emotions spinning out of control." Her third single, "Romantic Garbage", was released in March 2019, before the release of the full four-track EP, Super Sad Generation in early April 2019. The EP was recorded in her home in South West London and an Airbnb in the Angel district of London  with producer and co-writer Gianluca Buccellati. 

Parks performed her first-ever gig at The Great Escape in Brighton in May 2019, then went on to perform on the BBC Music Introducing stage at Glastonbury Festival in late June 2019, as well as at Latitude Festival in July 2019. She embarked on her first tour supporting Jordan Rakei on the UK leg of his tour in September 2019. Throughout the last half of 2019 Parks released the songs "George", "Second Guessing", "Sophie", and "Angel's Song" ahead of her second EP, Sophie. Sean Kerwick told DIY that the five-track EP "oozes with the hang-ups of heartbreak and mortality; a topic that seems to overshadow many gen-Z musicians."

2020–2022: Collapsed in Sunbeams 

Parks embarked on her first headlining tour of Europe in February and March 2020, but could not complete it due to the COVID-19 pandemic. In May 2020, Parks released the singles "Eugene" and "Black Dog", which were well received during the COVID-19 lockdown, the latter of which became BBC Radio 1's Tune of the Week. Parks made the front cover of NME in late July 2020. She won the AIM Independent Music Award for One to Watch in 2020 in August 2020, after losing the same award to Georgia a year before. Parks and Moses Boyd made the front cover of Music Week for the publication's indie takeover special following the AIM Awards ceremony. Parks released her debut album, Collapsed in Sunbeams, on 29 January 2021.

On 12 February 2021, Parks was the music act on The Graham Norton Show singing 'Caroline'. On 19 February 2021, Parks was the main guest of Jools Holland on his BBC programme Later....

On 11 May, Parks won the Breakthrough Artist Award at the 2021 Brit Awards.

On 9 September, the album Collapsed in Sunbeams won the Hyundai Mercury Prize for Album of the Year. Presenting the award, judge Annie MacManus said: "We chose an artist with a singular voice who uses lyrics of remarkable beauty … and connects deeply with her generation as she does so".

Following her Collapsed in Sunbeams tour, Parks has performed as the 2022 opening act for Harry Styles, Billie Eilish and Clairo.

On 25 June 2022, Parks performed a 53-minute set on The Park Stage at Glastonbury Festival 2022, before joining Phoebe Bridgers later in the day to perform "Graceland Too". 

During Glastonbury, Parks was selected as a guest for the CBeebies Bedtime Story, reading Once Upon a Rhythm by James Carter.

In September 2022, she cancelled her tour dates in the United States, citing mental health concerns.

2023–present: My Soft Machine 

On 18 January 2023, Parks announced the release of her second studio album, My Soft Machine, which is slated for release 26 May 2023. The album's lead single, "Weightless", was released with the announcement.

Personal life 
Parks is openly bisexual and is based in London. She was educated at Latymer Upper School in Hammersmith and completed her A Levels in early 2019 at Ashbourne College. In the autobiographical text on her Spotify profile, Parks claimed that she spent most of secondary school "feeling like that black kid who couldn't dance for shit, listening to too much emo music and crushing on some girl in her Spanish class." Parks' partner is the singer Ashnikko. 

Parks has named Sylvia Plath, Radiohead and Joni Mitchell as among her influences.

Discography

Studio albums

Extended plays

Singles

As lead artist

As featured artist

Promotional singles

Guest appearances

Music videos

Awards and nominations

Notes

References

External links 
  – official site
 

2000 births
Living people
21st-century Black British women singers
21st-century British poets
21st-century English women writers
People from Hammersmith
Singers from London
English people of Nigerian descent
English people of Chadian descent
English people of French descent
English women pop singers
English women singer-songwriters
British indie pop musicians
Bedroom pop musicians
Brit Award winners
English women poets
Bisexual musicians
English LGBT musicians
British LGBT singers
LGBT Black British people
20th-century LGBT people
21st-century LGBT people